This was the first edition of the event.

Lloyd Bourne and Jeff Klaparda won the title, defeating Carl Limberger and Mark Woodforde 6–3, 6–3 in the final.

Seeds

  Rick Leach /  Tim Pawsat (semifinals)
  Andy Kohlberg /  Michael Mortensen (quarterfinals)
  Carl Limberger /  Mark Woodforde (final)
  Lloyd Bourne /  Jeff Klaparda (champions)

Draw

Draw

References
Draw

Rye Brook Open
1987 Grand Prix (tennis)